Cliza Municipality is the first municipal section of the Germán Jordán Province in the Cochabamba Department, Bolivia. Its seat is Cliza.

References 

 Instituto Nacional de Estadistica de Bolivia

Municipalities of the Cochabamba Department